Ohimini is a Local Government Area of Benue State, Nigeria. Its headquarters are in the town of Idekpa-Okpiko.Ohimini was created out of the present Otukpo Local Government Area of Benue State. Major districts under the Ohimini local government are Onyagede which share boundary with Kogi state has the following villages, Amoke,  Enumona, Ogodu, Awume, Ikpoke, Ogoli, Ogande, Ugofu, Ipolabakpa, Umonomi and Iyaya, Okpiko, Agadagba, Oglewu and Idekpa the capital.

It has an area of 632 km² and a population of 71,482 at the 2006 census.

Historical background
Ohimini Local Government Area of Benue State, Nigeria, was created in December 1996 by the military regime of General Sani Abacha from the old Otukpo Local Government of Idomaland along with four other local government councils (LGCs) in the state. These LGCs are Agatu, Obi, Logo and Tarka.
The Local Government derived its name “Ohimini” from River Ohimini, the largest river in the council, cutting across the entire local government area.
The creation of the Local Government brought tremendous joy to its people who believed that the separation from the Old Otukpo would bring accelerated development to them.

Geographical Location
Ohimini Local Government is bounded to the North and North East by Otukpo Local Government, South by Okpokwu Local Government and on the West by Ankpa and Olamaboro Local Government Areas of Kogi State.
The postal code of the area is 972.

Population
The 2006 National Population Commission population census figures puts the population of Ohimini as 70,688 people comprising 35,876 and 34,812 males and females respectively.

Political Structure
The local government is divided into three zones A, B, and C with each zone comprising two clans. These are:
 A --  Ochobo and Oglewu clans
 B --  Agadagba and Okpiko clans
 C – Awume and Onyagede clans.
The Local Government is further sub-divided into ten (10) political wards as follows;

Leadership of the Local Government Administration Since Inception

Since the creation of the Local Government in 1996, the following persons have headed the administration in various capacities either as Sole Administrators, Elected Executive Chairmen, Caretaker Committee Chairmen or Directors General Services and Administration (DGSA).

Similarly, the legislative council of the Local Government was administered by the following officers as house leaders;

Note that legislative councils exist only when the executive councils are in place.

Religion
The Ohimini people are basically Christians with pockets of Muslims mainly in Onyagede clan.

Occupation
Ohimini is an agrarian society with the farmers taking full advantage of the fertile, well-drained arable land suitable for the cultivation of cassava, yams, millet, sorghum, rice, citrus fruits, palm produce, vegetables and livestock thus contributing to making the status of Benue State the “Food Basket of The Nation”.

It is believed that the Onyagede market (one of the largest market in Idoma land), is a major source of export of garri to neighbouring states like Plateau, Kano, Rivers and Kogi, amongst others.

Though large scale mechanized farming is not practiced by these peasant farmers, there is a bright future for investors of agro-based processing industries as they are assured of basic raw materials.

Natural resources
According to the Federal Government Geological Survey of Benue State, bricks, clay, bentonite, bauxite and coal are found in abundant quantity in Ohimini for exploration. The natural spring waters at Iyaya in Onyagede and Odelle in Okpiko-which are yet to be developed, will form a beautiful tourist attraction if fully tapped.

Prospects for investment
The new and developing Local Government is blessed with abundant human and natural resources that can sustain any agro-based industries and other investment.

Its easy accessibility from the eastern part of the country through Enugu in Enugu State, Ankpa in Kogi State, Naka in Gwer-West and Otukpo Local Government Areas both in Benue State as well as availability of constant power supply provided by its connection to the national grid make Ohimini a destination point for investors in Benue State.

References

Local Government Areas in Benue State